The Space Poop Challenge was a 2016 contest sponsored by NASA for new designs of space toilet systems for use in space suits.

The contest requests "proposed solutions for fecal, urine, and menstrual management systems to be used in the crew’s launch and entry suits over a continuous duration of up to 144 hours".

The contest was won by Dr. Thatcher Cardon.

See also 
 Space toilet
 Maximum Absorbency Garment

References

External links 

 Space Poop Challenge from NASA
 Space Poop Challenge from herox.com

Toilets
Space suit components
Spacecraft design
Challenge awards
2016 in space